Manulea palliatella is a moth of the family Erebidae. It is found in Southern, Central and Eastern Europe, Asia Minor, Iran, Afghanistan, Central Asia, Kazakhstan.

The wingspan is 32–36 mm. The moth flies in August depending on the location.

The larvae feed on Trinia glauca and Aster linosyris.

Subspecies
Manulea palliatella palliatella (southern and central Europe, the Crimea, Caucasus, Transcaucasia, Kazakhstan, Central Asia)
Manulea palliatella hyrcana (Daniel, 1939)
Manulea palliatella sericeoalba (Rothschild, 1912) (Kopet Dagh, Iran)

External links

 Eilema pseudocomplana on Moths and Butterflies of Europe and North Africa 
 Eilema pseudocomplana on Fauna Europaea
 Eilema pseudocomplana on www.lepiforum.de Taxonomy and photos

Lithosiina
Moths described in 1763
Moths of the Middle East
Moths of Europe
Moths of Asia
Taxa named by Giovanni Antonio Scopoli